Carlo Howard L. Passadoro  (1871 – 25 June 1921)  was a Welsh-Italian footballer  who won four Italian Football Championship titles with Genoa C.F.C. between 1899 and 1903.

Passadoro was born to Genoese parents  in Newport, Wales . His father is listed in 1881 census of Wales as a coal exporter living in the Roath area of Cardiff.

Honours
1899 Italian Football Championship (Genoa)
1900 Italian Football Championship (Genoa)
1902 Italian Football Championship (Genoa)
1903 Italian Football Championship (Genoa)

References

  1881 Wales Census
 Davide Rota, Dizionario illustrato dei giocatori genoani, De Ferrari, 2008.

Italian footballers
Welsh footballers
Welsh people of Italian descent
Genoa C.F.C. players
Footballers from Newport, Wales
1871 births
1921 deaths
Association football defenders